Hurricane Karl was a late-season and unusual tropical cyclone that formed within a larger extratropical cyclone. Karl was also the northernmost forming Atlantic hurricane on record in November. The fifteenth and final tropical cyclone, twelfth named storm, and ninth hurricane of the 1980 Atlantic hurricane season, Karl developed at the center of another, larger extratropical cyclone over the North Atlantic. After being classified a subtropical cyclone on November 25, it became more independent of its parent storm and grew into a full-fledged Category 1 hurricane. It peaked in intensity on November 26, and ultimately dissipated on November 29, as it merged with another system.

Karl holds the record for the northernmost formation of a November tropical or subtropical cyclone in the Atlantic Ocean. It also attained hurricane strength at an unusual latitude, and contributed to one of the most active Novembers on record in terms of tropical cyclones. However, it stayed over open waters and did not have any effects on land. It was the 11th named storm of the season.

Meteorological history

Hurricane Karl originated in a low pressure area that formed along a frontal boundary near the southeastern United States. It approached the Canadian Maritimes the next day and strengthened to below 1000 millibars. On November 24, the broad cyclone was located south of Newfoundland, and early the next day a mass of convection developed near the core. It evolved into a separate vortex, and due to the lack of inhibiting wind shear, a small cyclone developed. It became a subtropical storm at 00:00 UTC before executing a tight counterclockwise loop as it rotated within the larger cyclone. About 18 hours later, the storm strengthened and gained enough tropical characteristics to be designated a hurricane, accompanied by the formation of a pronounced eye feature. At the time, it was situated around 610 miles (1,110 km) west-southwest of the Azores. Although the development of a tropical cyclone within a non-tropical storm is rare, it is not unprecedented. The "Perfect Storm" unnamed hurricane in November 1991 and Subtropical Storm Alpha in September 2020 also formed in this manner.

After being classified as a hurricane, Karl gradually strengthened, and its circulation became more distinguished from the surrounding cloudiness. A trough that emerged from North America steered the hurricane eastward, and on November 26, it reached its peak intensity with maximum sustained winds of 85 mph (140 km/h) and a central barometric pressure reading of 985 mbar (hPa; 29.09 inHg). Karl maintained this strength for approximately 18 hours until beginning to weaken slightly as it accelerated towards the northeast. On November 27, the storm's eye became more ragged as the cyclone passed within 230 miles (370 km) of the Azores and started to show signs of deterioration. The trough over the North Atlantic developed into the dominant low pressure area, and Karl turned northward around its periphery. Karl became extratropical on November 28 and later merged with another approaching system within a day, and was declared dissipated by November 29.

Records

Hurricane Karl was unusual in several aspects. It developed late in the hurricane season, which runs from June 1 through November 30, over waters colder than the standard limit for tropical cyclone formation. It marked the farthest-north development of a November tropical or subtropical cyclone on record. While the 1991 unnamed hurricane was farther north, it became a subtropical storm late on October 31, and had moved south by November 1. Karl was reported at the time to be the farthest-east hurricane during the last 10 days of the month of November. Additionally, it maintained hurricane intensity until reaching 45.0°N, at which point it became extratropical; only Hurricane Lois in 1966 lasted as a hurricane farther north in the month of November.

When Karl became a hurricane on November 25, the 1980 season became notable for having two November hurricanes; the other was Jeanne. This tied 1932 and 1969 for the record of the most November hurricanes, which was later accomplished during the 1994 season. Later, 2001 broke this record with three hurricanes.

See also

Other tropical cyclones named Karl

References

External links

Preliminary Report
Advisory archive
Hurricane database

Karl
Karl (1980)
Karl